Coleophora lithargyrinella is a moth of the family Coleophoridae found in Europe.

Description
The head is yellow-ochreous. Antennae white, ringed with dark fuscous, towards apex indistinctly, basal joint ochreous. Forewings fuscous-ochreous. Hindwings are dark grey.

Biology
Adults are on wing from June to July in one generation per year.
The larvae feed on Arenaria serpyllifolia, Cerastium arvense, Cerastium glomeratum, Stellaria holostea and Stellaria media. It has a mouth angle of 25°-30°. The case has a double dorsal keel. Full-grown larvae can be found in May.

Distribution
It is found from Fennoscandia to the Pyrenees and Italy, and from Ireland to the Baltic States and Romania.

References

External links
 Lepiforum.de

lithargyrinella
Moths described in 1849
Moths of Europe
Taxa named by Philipp Christoph Zeller